Mezek Peak is a sharp peak rising to 1650 m in Imeon Range on Smith Island, South Shetland Islands.  Situated 1.07 km east of Mount Pisgah and 4.02 km southwest by south of Mount Christi.  Precipitous and predominantly ice-free east slopes.  Overlooking Dalgopol Glacier to the northwest and Nosei Glacier to the east.  Bulgarian early mapping in 2009.  Named after the medieval fortress of Mezek in southeastern Bulgaria.

Maps
Chart of South Shetland including Coronation Island, &c. from the exploration of the sloop Dove in the years 1821 and 1822 by George Powell Commander of the same. Scale ca. 1:200000. London: Laurie, 1822.
  L.L. Ivanov. Antarctica: Livingston Island and Greenwich, Robert, Snow and Smith Islands. Scale 1:120000 topographic map. Troyan: Manfred Wörner Foundation, 2010.  (First edition 2009. )
 South Shetland Islands: Smith and Low Islands. Scale 1:150000 topographic map No. 13677. British Antarctic Survey, 2009.
 Antarctic Digital Database (ADD). Scale 1:250000 topographic map of Antarctica. Scientific Committee on Antarctic Research (SCAR). Since 1993, regularly upgraded and updated.
 L.L. Ivanov. Antarctica: Livingston Island and Smith Island. Scale 1:100000 topographic map. Manfred Wörner Foundation, 2017.

References
 Mezek Peak. SCAR Composite Gazetteer of Antarctica.
 Bulgarian Antarctic Gazetteer. Antarctic Place-names Commission. (details in Bulgarian, basic data in English)

External links
 Mezek Peak. Copernix satellite image

Mountains of Smith Island (South Shetland Islands)
Bulgaria and the Antarctic